Alessandro Andreatta (born 4 February 1957 in Trento) is an Italian politician.

Career

He is a member of the Democratic Party and was elected Mayor of Trento at the 2009 local elections. He took office on 3 May 2009. Andreatta was re-elected for a second term in 2015.

See also
2009 Italian local elections
2015 Italian local elections
List of mayors of Trento

References

External links
 

1957 births
Living people
Mayors of Trento
Democratic Party (Italy) politicians